Ōtsu is the capital city of Shiga Prefecture, Japan

Ōtsu may also refer to:

Ōtsu Station, a railway station in Ōtsu, Shiga, Japan
Ōtsu District, Yamaguchi, a former district in Yamaguchi Prefecture, Japan
Ōtsu (surname), a Japanese surname
Ōtsu-juku, a station of the Nakasendō and the Tōkaidō
Otsu, a variant of the Type 89 I-Go medium tank